Euderces picipes is a species of beetle in the family Cerambycidae. It was described by Johan Christian Fabricius in 1787 and is known from the United States.

References

Euderces
Beetles of the United States
Beetles described in 1787
Taxa named by Johan Christian Fabricius